On September 22, 1975, Sara Jane Moore attempted to assassinate Gerald Ford in San Francisco. Moore fired two gunshots at President Ford, both of which missed.

Background 
Sara Jane Moore had been evaluated by the Secret Service earlier in 1975, but agents decided that she posed no danger to the president. She was detained by police on an illegal handgun charge the day before the assassination attempt but was released. The police confiscated her .44 caliber revolver and 113 rounds of ammunition.

President Gerald Ford was traveling to San Francisco to address a World Affairs Council.

Assassination attempt 
At 3:30 p.m., after speaking to the World Affairs Council, Ford emerged from the Post Street entrance of the St. Francis Hotel in Union Square, then walked toward his limousine. Before boarding the vehicle, he stopped and waved to the crowd that had gathered across the street.

Sara Jane Moore was standing in the crowd 40 feet away from Ford when she fired two shots with her .38 Special revolver. The first shot missed Ford's head by 5 inches and passed through the wall above the doorway Ford had just walked out of. A bystander named Oliver Sipple heard the sound of the first shot and dove at Moore, grabbing her shooting arm before she pulled the trigger a second time. The second shot struck John Ludwig, a 42-year-old taxi driver standing inside the hotel, in the groin. Ludwig survived.

San Francisco Police Capt. Timothy Hettrich grabbed Moore and wrestled the gun from her hand. Many other officers immediately joined in subduing Moore. In the meantime, the president's Secret Service team pushed Ford into his waiting limousine where the Secret Service and Donald Rumsfeld lay on top of him. The limousine raced to San Francisco International Airport (SFO) where Ford boarded Air Force One and, after being joined by the First Lady, flew back to Washington, D.C.

Moore explained in a 2009 interview that her motive was to spark a violent revolution in order to bring change to America.

Aftermath

Sara Jane Moore 

Moore pleaded guilty to charges of attempted assassination on December 12, 1975. The following month, on January 15, 1976, she was sentenced to life imprisonment. On December 31, 2007, at the age of 77, Moore was released on parole.

Oliver Sipple 

Oliver Sipple was commended at the scene by Secret Service and the San Francisco Police for his actions; the media portrayed him as a national hero. Three days after the assassination attempt in San Francisco, Sipple received a letter from President Ford praising him for his heroic actions.

All of the media publicity about him was not without controversy, however. Upon realizing that Sipple was gay, the media began broadcasting this information. That became the first time that Sipple's parents and family found out that Sipple was homosexual, as he had been hiding it from them. After learning about his sexual orientation, much of his family, including his parents, disowned him, and were subsequently estranged from him, but later were reconciled. Sipple died in 1989.

President Ford 

After President Ford was rushed to the SFO tarmac in his limousine, he quickly boarded Air Force One. Before Ford could depart on his return trip to the nation's capital, however, the plane had to wait for his wife Betty, the First Lady, who was carrying out her own schedule of events on the Peninsula.

In addition to the San Francisco incident, Ford had escaped unharmed from a previous assassination attempt in Sacramento, California, which occurred 17 days earlier on September 5, 1975. In response to the two occurrences in the same month, President Ford subsequently wore a bulletproof trench coat in public, beginning in October 1975.

Ford, who had succeeded to the presidency upon the resignation of Richard Nixon in 1974, ran for election in 1976. He lost to Jimmy Carter, by 297–240 in the electoral vote, and did not run for public office again. In 2006, Ford died from natural causes.

See also 
 List of United States presidential assassination attempts and plots

References 

1970s in politics
1970s in San Francisco
1975 crimes in the United States
1975 in American politics
1975 in California
1975 in politics
1975 in San Francisco
Attempted assassinations of presidents of the United States
Crime in San Francisco
Crimes in California
History of women in California
LGBT history in San Francisco
LGBT portrayals in mass media
Politics of San Francisco
Presidency of Gerald Ford
San Francisco Police Department
September 1975 events in the United States
Union Square, San Francisco
United States Secret Service
Women and death
World Affairs Councils